St. Ignatius College, Santiago is a private Catholic primary and secondary school, located in Santiago, Chile. The school was founded by the Society of Jesus in 1856 and is run by the Jesuit St. Ignatius Foundation as a part of the Ignatian Educational Network of Chile, the Latin American Federation of Jesuit Colleges, and the Latin American Federation of the Society of Jesus (FLACSI).

The school is the second oldest private school in Santiago after Padres Franceses de Santiago.

History
In 1854, San Ignacio was founded by Jesuits from Buenos Aires at the behest of Rafael Valentín Valdivieso, Archbishop of Santiago. The school opened in 1854 in Santiago and within a year had 150 students. To the classroom building and Jesuit residence the Church of St. Ignatius was added in 1859.

Notable alumni

 Rafael Araneda (1969) - TV presenter
 Claudio Bravo (1936-2011) - painter
 Carlos González Cruchaga (1921-2008) - bishop of Talca (1967-1996)
 Federico Errázuriz Echaurren (1850-1901) - President of Chile
 Mariano Fernandez (1945) - politician
 Javier Ángel Figueroa (1862-1945) - lawyer and politician
 Emiliano Figueroa (1866-1931) - President of Chile
 Vicente Huidobro (1893-1948) - poet
 Alberto Hurtado (1901-1952) - saint
 Bernardo Leighton (1909-1995) - politician
 Sergio Livingstone (1920-2012) - association football player
 Pablo Longueira (1958) - politician
 Agustín Edwards Mac-Clure (1878-1941) - lawyer and businessman
 Carlos Walker Martínez (1842-1905) - politician
 Juan Esteban Montero (1879-1948) - President of Chile
 Jaime Ravinet (1946) - politician, businessman
 Felipe Seymour (1987) - association football player
 Julio Silva Solar (1926) - politician
 Carlos Soto (1964) - association football player
 Raimundo Tupper (1969-1995) - association football player
 Gabriel Valdes (1919-2011) - politician

See also

 Catholic Church in Chile
 Education in Chile
 List of Jesuit schools

References

External links 
 Official website

Jesuit secondary schools in Chile
Jesuit primary schools in Chile
Schools in Santiago, Chile
Educational institutions established in 1856
1856 establishments in Chile